Al Qibla (Arabic: direction of Mecca) was the official gazette of the Kingdom of Hejaz. It was in circulation between 1916 and 1924 and headquartered in Mecca. The paper was a four-page broadsheet and published twice a week, on Mondays and on Thursdays.

The slogan of Al Qibla was the following verse taken from Quran:
And We did not make the qibla which you used to face except that We might make evident who would follow the Messenger from those who would turn on their heels.

History and profile
Al Qibla was first published on 15 August 1916, five weeks after the capture of Mecca by Sharif Hussein. The founders of the paper were Muhib Al Din Al Khatib and Fuad Al Khatib. It was published by Wilāya Press in Mecca on a semi-weekly basis. Muhib Al Din Al Khatib was also its founding editor-in-chief. Tayeb Al Sassi also served in the post. The paper featured international news based on the official communiques from Cairo, local news and writings of leading Arabic writers concerning ethical and social virtues. It also published reports from European and other foreign newspapers and periodicals. The British agents in the region helped the distribution of the paper. Following capture of Hejaz by Abdulaziz bin Abdul Rahman Al Saud, founder and later king of Saudi Arabia, Al Qibla was replaced by Umm al Qura. Al Qibla folded after the publication of the last issue in September 1924. It produced a total of 852 issues during its lifetime.

Contributors and political stance
Sharif Hussein was closely interested in the design of the paper and the language used in the news. He also published several articles in the paper which was supported by the British authorities. From 1919 his name appeared as the editor-in-chief of the paper in the masthead. The contributors of Al Qibla were mostly Syrian exiles living in Egypt. 

Al Qibla had an Arabist and Islamist ideology. The goal of the paper was to strengthen the awareness of the Arabs and Muslims about the threats of Wahhabism against Islam. Al Qibla also opposed to the Committee of Union and Progress and the military alliance of the Ottoman Empire with the Central Powers in World War I. In addition, Sharif Hussein employed the publication to justify his revolt against the Ottoman Empire. Following the publication of the Balfour Declaration in November 1917 he published a number of articles in Al Qibla in which he called for the cooperation with Jews and asked Arabs to avoid conflicts with the British in that they would help them achieve independence.

Legacy
In the anniversary of the foundation of the Hashemite Kingdom of Hejaz several issues of Al Qibla were reprinted and distributed as a supplement of the Jordanian daily newspapers, including The Jordan Times, in 2016.

References

1916 establishments in Asia
1924 disestablishments in Asia
Arabic-language newspapers
Defunct newspapers published in Saudi Arabia
Former state media
Government gazettes
Mass media in Mecca
Publications established in 1916
Publications disestablished in 1924